The Pyrgi Tablets (dated ) are three golden plates inscribed with a bilingual Phoenician–Etruscan dedicatory text. They are the oldest historical source documents from pre-Roman Italy and are rare examples of texts in these languages. They were discovered in 1964 during a series of excavations at the site of ancient Pyrgi, on the Tyrrhenian coast of Italy in Latium (Lazio). The text records the foundation of a temple and its dedication to the Phoenician goddess Astarte, who is identified with the Etruscan supreme goddess Uni in the Etruscan text. The temple's construction is attributed to Tiberius Velianas, ruler of the nearby city of Caere.

Two of the tablets are inscribed in the Etruscan language, the third in Phoenician. The writings are important in providing both a bilingual text that allows researchers to use knowledge of Phoenician to interpret Etruscan, and evidence of Phoenician or Punic influence in the Western Mediterranean. They may relate to Polybius's report (Hist. 3,22) of an ancient and almost unintelligible treaty between the Romans and the Carthaginians, which he dated to the consulships of Lucius Junius Brutus and Lucius Tarquinius Collatinus (509 BC).

The Phoenician inscriptions are known as KAI 277. The tablets are now held at the National Etruscan Museum, Villa Giulia, Rome.

Pallottino has claimed that the existence of this bilingual suggests an attempt by Carthage to support or impose a ruler (Tiberius Velianas) over Caere at a time when Etruscan sea power was waning and to be sure that this region, with strong cultural ties to Greek settlements to the south, stayed in the Etrusco-Carthaginian confederacy. The exact nature of the rule of Tiberius Velianas has been the subject of much discussion. The Phoenician root MLK refers to sole power, often associated with a king. But the Etruscan text does not use the Etruscan word for "king"--lauχum, instead presenting the term for "magistrate"--zilac (perhaps modified by a word that may mean "great"). This suggests that Tiberius Velianas may have been a tyrant of the kind found in some Greek cities of the time. Building a temple, claiming to have been addressed by a god, and creating or strengthening his connections with foreign powers may all have been ways that he sought to solidify and legitimate his own power.

Another area that the Pyrgi Tablets seem to throw light on is that Carthage was indeed involved in central Italy at this point in history. Such involvement was suggested by mentions by Polybius of a treaty between Rome and Carthage at about the same time period (circa 500 BC), and by Herodotus's accounts of Carthaginian involvement in the Battle of Allia (though this was over a century later). But these isolated accounts did not have any contemporaneous texts from the area to support them until these tablets were unearthed and interpreted. Schmidtz originally claimed that the language pointed more toward an eastern Mediterranean form of Phoenician rather than to Punic/Carthaginian. But he has more recently reversed this view, and he even sees the possibility that the Carthaginians are directly referred to in the text.

The text is also important for our understanding of religion in central Italy around the year 500 BC. Specifically, it suggests that the commemoration of the death of Adonis was an important rite in Central Italy at least at this time (around 500 BC), that is if, as is generally assumed, the Phoenician phrase bym qbr ʼlm "on the day of the burial of the divinity" refers to this rite. This claim would be further strengthened if Schmidtz's recent claim can be accepted that the Phoenician phrase bmt n' bbt means "at the death of (the) Handsome (one) [=Adonis]." Together with evidence of the rite of Adonai in the Liber Linteus in the 7th column, there is a strong likelihood that the ritual was practiced in (at least) the southern part of Etruria from at least circe 500 BC through the second century BC (depending on one's dating of the Liber Linteus). It must be noted, though that Adonis himself does not seem to be directly mentioned in any of the extant language of either text.

Phoenician text
The Phoenician inscriptions are known as KAI 277; they read:

lrbt lʻštrt,
 For the Lady, for Astarte,

ʼšr qdš ʼz, ʼš pʻl, wʼš ytn tbryʼ wlnš mlk ʻl kyšryʼ
 this is the holy place, which was made, and which was placed (by) Tiberius Velianas, king over Kasriye (= Caerites?),

byrḥ zbḥ šmš, bmtnʼ bbt.
 during the month of the sacrifice to the Sun, as an offering in the temple.

 wbn tw, kʻštrt ʼrš bdy, lmlky šnt šlš /// byrḥ krr, bym qbr ʼlm
 And he built a chamber (or -bn TW = "Tiberius Velianas built (it)"), because Astarte requested (this) from him, year three "3" of his reign, in the month of Krr, on the day of the burial of the divinity.

wšnt lmʼš ʼlm bbty šnt km h kkb m ʼl.
 And (may) the years of the statue of the deity in her temple (be) years like (or "as numerous as") the stars.

The Phoenician text has long been known to be in a Semitic, more specifically a Canaanite language (specifically North Canaanite; South Canaanite dialects include Hebrew, Moabite, and Edomite; More distantly related:  Aramaic and Ugaritic); hence there was no need for it to be "deciphered."  And while most of the inscription can certainly reliably be read, certain passages are philologically uncertain on account of perceived complications of syntax and the vocabulary employed in the inscription, and as such they have become the source of debate among both Semiticists and Classicists.

For example, other translations of the final line, besides that cited above, include: "And I made a duplicate of the statue of the goddess <Astarte> in her temple as do the Kakkabites [?Carthaginians]"; and "As for the red robe of the statues of the goddess <Astarte> in her temple, her/its red robe is like a those of the gods of the Kakkabites [Carthaginians]" (both of these from Krahmalkov's Phoenician-Punic Dictionary). Further, In Schmidtz's 2016 treatment of the text, he reinterprets the string bmtnʼ bbt (translated above and commonly as "as an offering in the temple") as bmt n' bbt to mean "at the death of (the) Handsome (one) [=Adonis]."

Etruscan text
This partial English translation is generally speculative, following van der Meer, except where noted. Line breaks are indicated with / with line numbers in superscript immediately following. Note that Schmitz has pointed out that "Etruscologists...dispute nearly every word in the Etruscan texts."

First plate

Ita . tmia . icac . he/2ramašva vatieχe /3 unial astres θemia /4 sa  meχ θuta.
This temple and sacred buildings (herama-šva) have been requested by Uni...having been built at his own cost, (?)

θefa/5riei velianas sal /6 cluvenias turu/7ce 
Tiberius Velianas ...has given (it) as an offering(?), (or "according to her own (sal) wishes (cluvenias))

munistas θuvas/8 tameresca . 
(as) custodian(?) of the place(?) of the cella (or "the funeral chamber" tameres-ca)

ilacve ./9 tule. rase .
during the feast of the month of Tuler

nac ci avi/l χar var tesiamet / ale 
when three years (were) full (?) from the day of Tesiamet

 ilacve.  alšase/12
on the feast of (the month) Alsasa

nac . atranes . zila / cal . sel eita la acnašv/ers .
when the atranes of the  magistrate (was??) (the) great acnasvers.

Itanim . heram / ve . avil . eniaca . pul/umχva
Indeed, in this sanctuary, the years are (going to be) as many as the stars.

Second plate 
nac . θefarie . vel/1iiunas . θ amuce /2 cleva . etanal/3
cleva acasri halx tei vacil iceusuni savlasieis   mulu rizile picasri savlasieis vacil lunas1e /  mulu on a vessel so  that is your subject. Tmia 'l and amuce both found inscribed on vessels and that is what cleva relates to.
When Tiberius Velianas had built the cleva ("altar(s)"? desiderata?) of etan (epithet of Uni?)

masan . tiur /4 unias . šelace .
he dedicated (šela-ce) an offering during the month (tiur) of Juno. tiur. usually  stands before  the word avil for year as  tiur im  in the Liber linteus.

v/5acal . tmial . a/6vilχval . amuc/7e . pulumχv/8a . snuiaφ . 
The yearly (avil-χva-l literally "of the years") offerings for the temple were (to be like the) eternal (snuiaφ?) stars.

Notes: Wylin translates šelace vacal tmial (4-5) as "has ratified the offering of the temple." However, Steinbauer (agreeing with Rix) has challenged this assumptions and, considering that it seems to be positioned at the beginning of a series of phrases within the contexts of a step-by-step instruction in the Liber Linteus, proposed that vacal (with its variants vacil and vacl) simply means "then."

A minimalist 'translation' drawing only on well established meanings of Etruscan words, and not depending on the Phoenician text (which is often itself uncertain, see above, and is, in any case, not a word for word translation) has been presented by Adiego:

This tmia- and the herama, which were ...-ed from the part of Uni, Thefarie Velianas, ...ing the meχ θuta, gave to her, the cluvenia- (or: to his cluvenia-), to/of the muni θuva, that from the chamber (?) in the day-ilacv tuleras-, when three years χurvar. In the day-ilacv the tešiam(a)- alsaš-, when of the zilaχ-magistracy atrane, that sele acnavers, and this(?)/thus...-ed the year eniaca the pulum-s.

When Thefarie Veliiunas ...-ed a cleva-offering etenal masan the month unias ...-ed, vacal the pulum-s of the years of the tmia- were sniuaφ.

Supplementary Etruscan Texts

Inscription on a bronze tablet at Pyrgi 
These were much more damaged than the gold tablets above. 
Cr 4.3:

[...]atalen[----]s tin[--
[----]e[...] spuria[z]es . tera[s] spu[r]iaze[...]
u]neial var θvarie χia uneial χias
tin[...]talenas seas tinas θvarienas [...]e[...]ur
...]ar[...]ra[...]il[...]a[...]p[...

Cr 4.2
eta : θesan:e:tras u:ni(χ?)iaθi ha[...]
hutilatina e:tiasas: a:calia[...]
θanaχ:vilus caθar:naial[...]

Deities mentioned here include Catha, Thesan, Uni Chia, Tina Atalena Sea, Tina Thvariena, and Spuriaze.

Inscriptions on vessels found in the sanctuary at Pyrgi 

 1 ]tmia[  2 ]usa[ 
n32, fragment of a vase, VI

unial
 (div) patera, or plate V TLE 877

unial
(div) patera, or plate V REE 40 n54

 ]starte/s/  [?] cve[r ]starte/ / 
(div?) fragment of a vase, or vessel IV REE 56 n31

mi : s'uris : cavaθas
(div)patera, or plate V REE 64 n36

]cavaθas  2]a emini[
(div)Greek kylix, V REE 56 n24

Lead tablet from the temple of Minerva at Castrum Novum (near Pyrgi) (CIE 6310) 

Side 1:
MMMCCC lan[-]mite . [
...]inia . tei . a  emei ca . zu[-]una . za[...
...]ipas . [-]in[...]ver . mulven[...
...] . nuna ("offering")[...] nun . ena . t[...
...]e . hu[...]al . nun ena .
...]ur . t[...]na . vacil . c[...

...]pulunza . ipal . sac ("holy")[...
...]talte . acni talte . iu[...
...]umnle[...]menatina . te[---]un[...
...]us . -u--helucu . acasa  . tei . luru[...
...]t[...-]sice . lanumite . icana[...
...]aei . tesa . nac[...]ce . mulv[...
...]ur . t[...]na . vacil . c[                                  
...]pa . mlaka [....]ama .

Side 2:

...]ite . icec[......] civeis . m[...
...] . unue . ha[...]u . eizurva . t[...
...]n[-]va . mlacia . hecia ("to do, place") . iperi . apa ("father")[...
...]esunamul ame

...]iama . im[...]nuta : h[...
...] . rin[...]v . a emeican . s[-]uinia . ip[...

Notes: Words also occurring in the gold Pyrgi Tablets are in bold: pulun/m "star(s)?; vaci/al "sacrifice/libation" , or "then"; nac "when."
Words and sequences recurring within the text are in italics: lan(u)mite ?; a  emei ca . z/suu/ina ? (ca "this"); mul-v- "to offer"; nun ena "offering" (nun?) "some" (ena?); ip-eri/-unu/-al (relative pronoun?)'; mlaka/cia "beautiful"; te-i (demonstrative pronoun); am-e/-a "be"; ac-ni/-asa ("to do, offer"); talte (< talitha "girl"??); icec-in, icana- ? (< ic "as"??).

Notes

References

First printed edition
Colonna, G. – Garbini, G. – Pallottino, M. – Vlad Borrelli, L., '"Scavi nel santuario etrusco di
Pyrgi. Relazione preliminare della settima campagna, 1964, e scoperta di tre lamine d’oro inscritte in
etrusco e punico”, ArchCl 16, 1964: 49-117.
 Colonna, G., “I dati dello scavo”: 50-57.
 Pallotino, M., “Scoperta e prima valutazione delle lamine inscritte”: 58-63.
 Vlad Borrelli, L., “Nota tecnica sulle lamine”: 64-65.
 Garbini, G., “L’iscrizione punica”: 66-76.
 Pallotino, M., “Le iscrizioni etrusche”: 76-104.
 Pallotino, M., “Conclusioni storiche”: 104-117.

Other references

 Adams, J. N. (2003) Bilingualism and the Latin Language, Cambridge: 202-206.
 Adiego, I.-X. (2015-2016) “The Etruscan Text of Pyrgi Golden Tablets: Certainties and Uncertainties”, in  Bellelli, V. Le lamine di Pyrgi, Verona : 135-156. 
 Agostiniani, L. (2007)Scritti scelti di Luciano Agostiniani: omaggio per il suo 65mo compleanno, Tomo I, scritti etruschi, AIONLing 25 [2003]), Napoli 
 Amadsi Guzzo M. G. (1995) “Mondes étrusque et italique”, in V. Krings (éd.), La civilisation phénicienne et punique. Manuel de recherche, Leiden / New York / Köln: 663-673 (671-673)
 Amadsi Guzzo, M. G.(2014) “Punic Scripts”, in J. A. Hackett & W. E. Aufrecht (eds.), An Eye for Form. Epigraphic Essays in Honor of G. F. M. Cross, Winona Lake, Indiana, 314-333 (320-322).
 Amadsi Guzzo, M. G. (2015-2016) “Sull’ambientazione della lamina fenicia di Pyrgi”, in Bellelli Le lamine di Pyrgi  Verona : 5-19.
 Baglione, M. P. – Colonna, G. (1997) “Appendice I”, in A. Maggiani, Vasi attici figurati con dediche a divinità etrusche, Roma: 85-98.
 Belfiore, V. (2011) Il Liber Linteus di Zagabria. Testualità e contenuto, Pisa / Roma
 Belfiore, V. (2012) “Studi sul lessico ‘sacro’. Laris Pulenas, le lamine di Pyrgi e la bilingue di Pesaro”, Rasenna: Journal of the Center for Etruscan Studies 3/1, art. 3: 1-20.
 Belfiore, V. (2014) La morfologia derivativa in etrusco. Formazioni di parole in -na e in -ra, Pisa/Roma: 105-106.
 Belfiore, V. (2015-2016) “Nuovi spunti di riflessione sulle lamine di Pyrgi in etrusco”, Bellelli Le lamine di Pyrgi  Verona: 103-134.
 Benelli, E. (2007) Le iscrizioni etrusche. Leggerle e capirle, Ancona: 265-266.
 Benelli, E. (2015-2016) “Riforme della scrittura e cultura epigrafica al tempo delle lamine di Pyrgi”, in Bellelli Le lamine di Pyrgi  Verona : 81-88.
 Bellelli, V. and P. Xella (eds) (2015-2016) Le lamine di Pyrgi: Nuovi studi sulle iscrizioni in etrusco e in fenicio nel cinquantenario della scoperta SEL 32-33; Verona
 Colonna, G. (2000)  Il santuario di Pyrgi dalle origini mitistoriche agli altorilievi dei Sette e di Leucoteia. Roma; Università degli studi di Roma La Sapienza.
 Colona, G. (2007) " L’Apollo di Pyrgi, ´ur s /´uri (il “Nero”) e l’Apollo Sourios," in Studi Etrusci 73, (2009), pp. 101-134.
 Cristofani, M. (1996) “Sulla dedica di Pyrgi”, in E. ACQUARO (ed.), Alle soglie della classicità. Il Mediterraneo tra tradizione e innovazione. Studi in onore di Sabatino Moscati, III, Pisa / Roma: 1117-1126.
 De Simone, C. (2012) “Il teonimo Šuri: riflessioni ad alta voce”, Mediterranea 9: 107-132.
 Egan, R. B. (2004) “Carthage, kkb, kakkabh and the kkbm at Pyrgi”, RSF 32,1, [2006]: 79-85.
 Eichner, H. (2011) “Anmerkungen zum Etruskischen”, in G. ROCCA (ed.), Le lingue dell’Italia antica: Iscrizioni, testi e grammatica. In memoriam Helmut Rix (1926-2004). Atti del Convegno internazionale (Milano 2011), (= Alessandria V), Alessandria: 67-92 (77-78).
 Hadas-Label, J. (2004) Le bilinguisme étrusco-latin. Contribution à l'étude de la romanisation de l'Étrurie, Louvain / Paris: 136-148.
 Kropp, M.(1994) “Versioni indipendenti o traduzione? Rilettura delle lamine d’oro di Pyrgi”, in Circolazioni culturali nel Mediterraneo antico. Atti della VI giornata Camito-Semitica e Indoeuropea – I Convegno internazionale di Linguistica dell’area mediterranea (Sassari, 24-27 aprile 1991), Cagliari: 189-196.
 Maras, D. F. (2013) “Area sud: ricerche in corso sulla documentazione epigrafica (contesti, supporti, formulari, teonimi)” in M. P. BAGLIONE – M. D. GENTILI (edd.), Riflessioni su Pyrgi, Roma: 195-206.
 Maras, D. F. & Wallace, R. E. (2015) “Uni and the Golden Gift of Thefarie. The 50th Anniversary of the Discovery of the Golden Tablets of Pyrgi”, Etruscan News 17, Winter: 1,4,20.
 Maras, D. F. (2015-2016) “Lettere e sacro. Breve storia della scrittura nel santuario etrusco di Pyrgi”, in Benelli, E Le lamine di Pyrgi (= SEL 32-33), Verona: 89-101.
 Pittau, M (1996) "Gli Etruschi e Cartagine: i documenti epigrafici". L'Africa romana: atti dell'11. Convegno di studio, 15-18 dicembre 1994, Cartagine, Tunisia. Sassari, Editrice Il torchietto. V. 3, p. 1657-1674.
 Pittau, M. (2000) Tabula Cortonensis, lamine di Pirgi e altri testi etruschi, Sassari.
 Rigobianco, L. (2013) Su numerus, genus e sexus. Elementi per una grammatica dell’etrusco, Roma : 54-56.
 Röllig, W. (1996)“Akkadisch tu’um, di’um, phönizisch tw, aramäisch twn: Versuch einer Klärung”, in E. Acquardo (ed.) Alle soglie della classicità. Il Mediterraneo tra tradizione e innovazione: Studi in onore di Sabatino Moscati, vol. III, Roma: 1203-1207.
 Schmitz, PH. C. (1995) “The Phoenician Text from the Etruscan Sanctuary at Pyrgi”, JAOS 115, 559-575.
 Schmitz, PH. C.(2007) “Adonis in the Phoenician Text from Pyrgi? A New Reading of KAI 277.5”, Etruscan News: 9, 13.
 Schmitz, PH. C. (2013) “Phoenician and Punic Religion”, in M. SALTZMAN (ed.), The Cambridge History of Religions in the Classical World, vol. 1., From the Bronze Age to the Hellenistic Era, Cambridge: 205-233.
 Schmitz, PH. C. (2015-2016)“Sempre Pyrgi. A Retraction and Reassessment of the Phoenician Text”, in Bellelli Le lamine di Pyrgi, Verona: 33-43.
 Steinbauer, D. (1999) Neues Handbuch des Etruskischen, St. Katharinen: 196-209.
 Torelli, M. (2003) “’Αγαλήτορα· παῐδα. Τυρρηνοί (TLE2 802). Brevi considerazioni su una glossa etrusca”, in S. MARCHESINI& P. POCCETTI (edd.), Linguistica è storia. Sprachwissenschaft ist Geschichte. Scritti in onore di Carlo de Simone, Pisa: 171-177 (173).
 van der Meer, B. ( 2007) Liber Linteus Zagrabiensis. The Linen Book of Zagreb. A Comment on the Longest Etruscan Text, Louvain / Dudley.
 van Heems, G. (2015) “Idéologie et écriture: réflexions sur les mentions de titres et magistratures dans les inscriptions étrusques”, in M.-L. HAACK (éd.), L’écriture et l’espace de la mort. Épigraphie et nécropoles à l'époque pré-romaine [en ligne], Roma: Publications de l’École française de Rome.
 van Heems, G. (2011) “Accord sur le désaccord: quelques réflexions sur les rapports entre morphèmes casuels et adpositions en étrusque”, in M. FRUYT – M. MAZOYER – D. PARDEE (eds.), Grammatical Cases in the Languages of the Middle East and Europe, Chicago: 399-416.
 Wallace, R. E. (2008) Ziχ Rasna. A Manual of the Etruscan Language and Inscriptions, Ann Arbor: 8.
 Wylin, K. (2000) Il verbo etrusco. Ricerca morfosintattica delle forme usate in funzione verbale, Roma 
 Wylin, K. (2003) “Esiste una seconda lamina A di Pyrgi?” PdP 328, : 61-65.
 Wylin, K. (2004 [2005]) “Un terzo pronome/aggettivo dimostrativo etrusco sa”, Studi Etrusci 70, : 213-225.
 Wylin, K. (2006) “Pyrgi B et la rédaction de la tabula Cortonensis”, Revue belge de Philologie et d’Histoire 84,: 35-44.

External links 

 The Etruscan Texts Project A searchable database of Etruscan texts.
 Photograph, transliteration, and partial translation
 Tavola di Cortona e Lamine di Pyrgi - traduzione (Italian translation by Giovanni Semerano)
 Wikisource: Pyrgi Tablets

6th-century BCE texts
1964 archaeological discoveries
Collections of the Villa Giulia
Etruscan inscriptions
KAI inscriptions
Etruscan language
Gold objects
Multilingual texts
Phoenician inscriptions
Votive offering
Archaeological discoveries in Italy
Astarte
Archaeological artifacts